The Ten Commandments Monument is an outdoor monument installed on the Arkansas State Capitol grounds in Little Rock, Arkansas, in the United States. The monument is being challenged as unconstitutional by the American Civil Liberties Union (ACLU). The ACLU says that the monument demonstrates a religious preference, violating the First Amendment and the religious preference prohibition clause of the Arkansas State Constitution.

Initial installation 
The monument was erected on the Arkansas State Capitol grounds on 27 June 2017, then destroyed within 24 hours of its installation. The Freedom From Religion Foundation, which had criticized the erection of the Arkansas monument on public government property, also criticized the illegal destruction of the monument.  In a news release, FFRF stated: "FFRF does not condone violating the Constitution by erecting a Ten Commandments monument on the Arkansas Capitol grounds. Nor do we condone breaking the law to remove such a display."

Replacement and legal challenges
Following private fundraising from State Senator and Christian minister Jason Rapert, the monument was replaced on April 26, 2018.  In protest against the monument, The Satanic Temple offered to donate a bronze sculpture of Baphomet as a symbol of religious pluralism and freedom. The statue of goat-headed Baphomet was blocked because of a 2017 Arkansas law that requires legislative sponsorship for consideration of any monument.  According to the Satanic Temple, the state legislature's rejecting one monument while allowing the other demonstrates an illegal religious preference.  The Satanic Temple briefly exhibited their statue at the Capitol on August 16, 2018.  State senator Rapert told THV 11 news that he "respects everyone's right to free speech under the First Amendment." But, he continued, "It will be a very cold day in hell before an offensive statue will be forced upon us to be permanently erected on the grounds of the Arkansas State Capitol".  After the request to install the Baphomet statue was refused, in an alleged violation of the Equal Protection Clause, Satanic Temple members were granted legal standing to challenge the Ten Commandments monument.

The monument is being challenged as unconstitutional by the American Civil Liberties Union. The ACLU says that the monument demonstrates a religious preference, violating the First Amendment and the religious preference prohibition clause of the Arkansas State Constitution.  The Freedom from Religion Foundation, the American Humanist Association, and the Arkansas Society of Freethinkers are also involved in litigation to challenge the monument.

See also

 Ten Commandments Monument (Austin, Texas)
 Ten Commandments Monument (Oklahoma City)
 McCreary County v. American Civil Liberties Union (2005)
 Van Orden v. Perry (2005)

References

External links
 

2017 establishments in Arkansas
Monuments and memorials in Little Rock, Arkansas
Outdoor sculptures in Arkansas
Ten Commandments
Vandalized works of art in Arkansas